John (Juan) Ortega (born in 1840), was the first Spanish sailor to be awarded the United States' highest military decoration for valor in combat — the Medal of Honor. He distinguished himself, during the South Atlantic Blockade, by the Union Naval forces, during the American Civil War.

Biography
Ortega (birth name Juan Ortega) was born in Spain and immigrated to the United States. He became a resident of Pennsylvania. In 1863, he joined the Union Navy stationed in Pennsylvania, his adopted home state.

Ortega was assigned to  during the American Civil War. The Saratoga, commissioned in 1843, was the third ship of the United States Navy christened with that name.  It was a sloop-of-war under the command of Commander George Musalas Colvocoresses.

On January 13, 1864, Secretary of the United States Navy Gideon Welles, ordered  Commander Colvocoresses and USS Saratoga to proceed to Charleston, South Carolina, and report to Rear Admiral Dahlgren for duty in the South Atlantic Blockading Squadron in what is known as the Union blockade. This was a massive effort by the Union Navy to prevent the passage of trade goods, supplies, and arms to and from the Confederate States.

Ortega was a member of the landing parties from the ship who made several raids in August and September which resulted in the capture of many prisoners and the taking or destruction of substantial quantities of ordnance, ammunition, and supplies. A number of buildings, bridges, and salt works were destroyed during the expedition.

For his actions Seaman John Ortega was awarded the Medal of Honor and promoted to acting master's mate in August 1864. He deserted from the Navy in June 1865.

Medal of Honor citation

Awards and decorations
Ortega's awards and decorations include the following:

See also

List of Hispanic Medal of Honor recipients
List of Medal of Honor recipients
List of American Civil War Medal of Honor recipients: M–P
Hispanics in the American Civil War
Hispanics in the United States Navy

References

1840 births
Year of death missing
Spanish emigrants to the United States
United States Navy Medal of Honor recipients
United States Navy sailors
Foreign-born Medal of Honor recipients
American Civil War recipients of the Medal of Honor